Ardeadoris rubroannulata is a species of sea slug, a dorid nudibranch, a shell-less marine gastropod mollusk in the family Chromodorididae.

Distribution 
This species is found only along the Great Barrier Reef in Australia and in New Caledonia.

References

Chromodorididae
Gastropods described in 1986